Panagiotis Kanellopoulos or Panayotis Kanellopoulos (13 December 1902, in Patras, Achaea – 11 September 1986, in Athens) was a Greek writer, politician and Prime Minister of Greece. He was the Prime Minister of Greece deposed by the Greek military junta of 1967–1974.

Biography
Kanellopoulos studied law in Athens, Heidelberg and Munich. Kanellopoulos was an intellectual and author of books about politics, law, sociology, philosophy, and history. His book "I was born in 1402" received a literary award from the Academy of Athens.  He married Theano Poulikakos (Θεανώ Πουλικάκου).

After the start of the Axis occupation of Greece in 1941 he founded the Omiros resistance group, and in 1942 he fled to the Middle East, where he served as Minister of Defence under the Tsouderos government in exile during World War II. In November 1945, he served as Prime Minister for a short period of time. After the war he became Minister for Reconstruction under Georgios Papandreou in a national unity government. He also served in other ministerial posts under Alexandros Diomidis, Constantine Karamanlis and others till 1967 when he became Prime Minister.

On 9 July 1961 Panagiotis Kanellopoulos as Deputy Prime Minister in Konstantinos Karamanlis' government and German Vice-Chancellor Ludwig Erhard signed the protocols of Greece's Treaty of Association with the European Economic Community (EEC). The signing ceremony in Athens was attended by top government officials from the six-member group consisting of Germany, France, Italy, Belgium, Luxemburg and the Netherlands. The six member group was the early precursor of today's 25 member European Union. Economy Minister Aristidis Protopapadakis and Foreign Minister Evangelos Averoff were also present at the ceremony as well as Prime Minister Konstantinos Karamanlis.

His niece, Amalia married Karamanlis. In 1963 he succeeded Karamanlis as leader of the National Radical Union party (ERE).

He was the last Prime Minister (acting as a caretaker for the scheduled for 28 May) prior to the coup d'état of 21 April 1967. He was placed under house arrest for the next seven years. During the events leading to the metapolitefsi (the period of political transition following the fall of the military junta), Phaedon Gizikis actively considered giving Kanellopoulos the mandate to form a transitional government. After the metapolitefsi Kanellopoulos resumed his parliamentary career as a member of the New Democracy party. He declined offers to become President of Greece when the post was offered to him during the metapolitefsi.

Kanellopoulos was the nephew of Dimitrios Gounaris.

References

1902 births
1986 deaths
20th-century prime ministers of Greece
20th-century Greek philosophers
20th-century Greek historians
Politicians from Patras
National Unionist Party (Greece) politicians
National Political Union (1946) politicians
National Reconstruction Front (Greece) politicians
Greek Rally politicians
National Radical Union politicians
New Democracy (Greece) politicians
Prime Ministers of Greece
Deputy Prime Ministers of Greece
Finance ministers of Greece
Ministers of Military Affairs of Greece
Ministers of National Defence of Greece
Greek MPs 1946–1950
Greek MPs 1950–1951
Greek MPs 1951–1952
Greek MPs 1952–1956
Greek MPs 1956–1958
Greek MPs 1977–1981
Members of the Academy of Athens (modern)
Greek historians of philosophy
Greek political writers
National and Kapodistrian University of Athens alumni
Resistance to the Greek junta
Grand Crosses 1st class of the Order of Merit of the Federal Republic of Germany
1967 in Greece
1960s in Greek politics